Jiske Griffioen and Aniek van Koot defeated Marjolein Buis and Sabine Ellerbrock in the final,  7–6(7–3), 6–1 to win the women's doubles wheelchair tennis title at the 2015 US Open. With the win, van Koot completed the double career Grand Slam.

Yui Kamiji and Jordanne Whiley were the defending champions, but were defeated in the semifinals by Buis and Ellerbrock.

Seeds

Draw

Bracket

References
Draw

Wheelchair Women's Doubles
U.S. Open, 2015 Women's Doubles